Dead Flowers, Bottles, Bluegrass and Bones is the sixth full-length album by Californian punk rock band Swingin' Utters.

Background
Alongside the band's usual punk style of music, there is a strong presence of Pogues-influenced Irish folk on this album, perhaps even more heavily than on the band's previous album. The Swingin' Utters recorded Live in a Dive shortly after this album was released.

Reception

The Free Lance-Star gave the album a positive review, while Allmusic gave it a four and a half stars out of five rating, with reviewer Jo-Ann Greene calling it "a stomping mix of rabid punk and pub-crunching singalongs" and "the best yet from the band".

Track listing
All tracks written by Darius Koski except as noted.
 "No Pariah" – 1:30 
 "Glad" – 2:09 
 "Hopeless Vows" – 1:48 
 "Dead Flowers, Bottles, Bluegrass and Bones" (Johnny Bonnel, Koski) – 2:05 
 "All That I Can Give" – 2:24 
 "Sign in a Window" – 1:54 
 "Dont Ask Why" – 2:12 
 "Lampshade" – 2:56 
 "Letters to Yourself" – 2:35 
 "Heaven at Seventeen" – 1:43 
 "Leaves of Fate" (Bonnel, Koski) – 1:57 
 "If You Want Me To"  (Koski, Spike Slawson)   – 2:46 
 "Elation" (Goddard, Koski) – 1:40 
 "Poor Me" (Aust Koski, Koski) – 1:44
 "My Closed Mind" – 1:23 
 "Looking for Something to Follow" – 2:57 
 "Shadows and Lies"  – 1:57

Personnel
 Johnny Bonnel (vocals)
 Darius Koski (guitar, vocals, accordion, piano, organ, violin, viola)
 Greg McEntee (drums)
 Spike Slawson (bass, vocals)
Additional musicians
 Tom Brayton (percussion)
 mike busbee [sic] (vibraphone, bass on track #17, percussion)

References

External links
Swingin' Utters official discography

Swingin' Utters albums
Fat Wreck Chords albums
2003 albums